Póvoa de Lanhoso (alternatively Nossa Senhora do Amparo) is a Portuguese Freguesia in the Municipality of Póvoa de Lanhoso, with an area of 5.62 km2 and 5052 inhabitants (2011).

Population

References 

Freguesias of Póvoa de Lanhoso